Iran participated in the 2005 Asian Indoor Games held in Bangkok, Thailand from November 12, 2005 to November 19, 2005.

Competitors

Medal summary

Medal table

Medalists

Results by event

Futsal

Men

Indoor athletics

Men

Women

Muaythai

Men

Roller sports

Roller freestyle
Open

Skateboarding
Open

Sport climbing

Men

Women

References

External links
 2005 Asian Indoor Games official website

Nations at the 2005 Asian Indoor Games
Asian Indoor Games
2005